Ostrów Wielkopolski railway station is a railway station in Ostrów Wielkopolski, Greater Poland Voivodeship, Poland. The train services are operated by Przewozy Regionalne.

Train services
The station is served by the following service(s):

 Intercity services (IC) Wrocław Główny — Łódź — Warszawa Wschodnia
Intercity services (IC) Białystok - Warszawa - Łódź - Ostrów Wielkopolski - Wrocław
Intercity services (IC) Ełk - Białystok - Warszawa - Łódź - Ostrów Wielkopolski - Wrocław
 Intercity services (IC) Zgorzelec - Legnica - Wrocław - Ostrów Wielkopolski - Łódź - Warszawa
Intercity services (IC) Poznań - Ostrów Wielkopolski - Kępno - Lubliniec - Częstochowa - Kraków 
Intercity services (TLK) Poznań - Ostrów Wielkopolski - Kępno - Lubliniec - Częstochowa - Kraków 
 InterRegio services (IR) Ostrów Wielkopolski — Łódź — Warszawa Główna
 InterRegio services (IR) Poznań Główny — Ostrów Wielkopolski — Łódź — Warszawa Główna
 Regiona services (PR) Łódź Kaliska — Ostrów Wielkopolski 
 Regional services (PR) Łódź Kaliska — Ostrów Wielkopolski — Poznań Główny 
Regional services (PR) Wrocław - Oleśnica - Ostrów Wielkopolski 
Regional services (PR) Ostrów Wielkopolski — Kępno 
Regional services (PR) Ostrów Wielkopolski — Kępno — Kluczbork

References

Railway stations in Greater Poland Voivodeship
Railway stations served by Przewozy Regionalne InterRegio
Railway stations in Poland opened in 1875